Ocean Springs is a city in Jackson County, Mississippi, United States, approximately  east of Biloxi and west of Gautier. It is part of the Pascagoula, Mississippi Metropolitan Statistical Area. The population was 17,225 at the 2000 U.S. Census. As of the 2010 U.S. Census, the city of Ocean Springs had a population of 17,442.

The town has a reputation as an arts community. The town was voted as a top 10 Happiest Seaside Town by Coastal Living in 2015. Its historic and secluded down town area, with streets lined by live oak trees, is home to several art galleries and shops. It is also home to a number of ethnic restaurants relatively uncommon in surrounding communities.

Ocean Springs was the home town of the late Walter Inglis Anderson, a nationally renowned painter and muralist who died in 1965 from lung cancer. The town plays host to several festivals, including its Peter Anderson Festival and The Herb Festival.

Ocean Springs was severely damaged on August 29, 2005, by Hurricane Katrina, which destroyed many buildings along the shoreline, including the Ocean Springs Yacht Club, and the wooden replica of Fort Maurepas, and gutted or flooded other buildings. Katrina's  storm surge also destroyed the Biloxi Bay Bridge, which connected Biloxi to Ocean Springs.

History

The settlement of Fort Maurepas or Old Biloxi, in colonial French Louisiana (New France), began in April 1699 at present-day Ocean Springs, under the authority of King Louis XIV, as Fort Maurepas by Pierre Le Moyne d'Iberville. It was the first permanent French outpost in French Louisiana and was established as a foothold to prevent Spanish encroachment on France's colonial claims. The site was maintained well into the early 18th century.

The name Ocean Springs was coined by Dr. William Glover Austin in 1854. He believed the local springs had healing qualities. Ocean Springs became a prosperous resort town and after several years reinvented itself as a historically-oriented residential community. The history of the town is celebrated annually in re enactments depicting d'Iberville's landing near a replica of Fort Maurepas. The authorities had authorized John Egan to construct and operate a public wharf near this ancient fort site at the foot of Jackson Avenue prior to the Civil War. 
 
From colonial times to present day, seafood has been celebrated. The abundance of seafood allowed French and French-Canadian explorers and settlers to thrive within the Fort Maurepas/Old Biloxi area. In the late nineteenth century, the development of ice plant industries along the coast increased seafood sales. Locals and tourists can still purchase freshly harvested shrimp, fish, crabs, and oysters to this day because of this thriving industry.

Ocean Springs was in the international spotlight following Hurricane Katrina's landfall on August 29, 2005. The city, part of the Mississippi Gulf Coast directly hit by the storm, sustained significant damage. The Biloxi-Ocean Springs bridge, part of Highway 90 along the beach, was destroyed and was a widely broadcast visual testament to the hurricane's impact.

Biloxi Bay Bridge

Hurricane Katrina's  storm surge destroyed the Biloxi Bay Bridge on August 29, 2005, which connected Biloxi to Ocean Springs. The bridge was completed in 1962, and damaged in 1969 by Hurricane Camille. The Biloxi Bay Bridge replaced the aging War Memorial Bridge which opened in 1930. As of 2007, the majority of the bridge's remains have been removed via cranes based on barges located next to the bridge debris. The bridge ruins, capturing the breathtaking results of the force of Hurricane Katrina, had become a popular spot of photographers both professional and amateur. The construction for the new bridge was completed in April 2008. The new Biloxi Bay Bridge is 95' in height at its main span, and supports six lanes of traffic. Two lanes of the six-lane bridge opened November 1, 2007. The new bridge has a curving roadway due to the implemented design-build process. In order to speed the process of rebuilding, the main body of the bridge was moved outside of the previous bridge's debris area. The landing points for each side of U.S. Route 90 correspond with the previous bridge.

Geography and climate
The city is classified as having a subtropical climate. This has a hot, humid monsoon season, beginning in late spring and ending in early autumn, with frequent afternoon and evening thunderstorms with torrential downpours. Thunderstorms usually don't last long but can be strong or even severe. The area is also prone to tropical weather such as tropical depressions, tropical storms, and hurricanes. Autumns and springs are usually cool to warm. Winters typically are warm with cool spells. Cool spells are accompanied with strong, Northerly dry winds which are unexpectedly chilly but do not typically last more than just a couple of days. Summers are consistently hot and humid both day and night with high temperatures usually in the low nineties and low temperatures oftentimes just barely below 80 degrees.

Demographics

2020 census

As of the 2020 United States census, there were 18,429 people, 6,639 households, and 4,423 families residing in the city.

2010 census
As of the 2010 census, there were 17,442 people, 6,393 households, and 4,717 families residing within the city. The population density was 1,513.5 people per square mile. There were 7,814 housing units at an average density of 678.3 per square mile. The ethnic makeup of the city was 85.4% White, 7.4% African American, 0.40% Native American, 3.1% Asian, 0.1% Pacific Islander, 1.3% from other races, and 2.2% from two or more races. Hispanic or Latino of any race were 4.2% of the population.

Of the 6,393 households, 31.8% had children under the age of 18 living with them, 51.2% were married couples living together, 11.8% had a female householder with no husband present, and 32.5% were non-families. 27.1% of all households had householders living alone, and 12.5% consisted of someone living alone who was 65 years of age or older. The average household size was 2.48 and the average family size was 3.01.

In the city, the population was spread out, with 5.6% under the age of 5, 6.7% from 10 to 14, 6.6% from 15 to 19, 4.8% from 20 to 24, 5.1% from 25 to 29, 11.8% from 30 to 39, 15.4% from 40 to 49, 14.8% from 50 to 59, 11.1% from 60 to 69, and 11.6% from 70 and above. The median age was 42.1 years.

The median income for a household in Ocean Springs was $59,516, and the per capita income was $33,107. About 9.7% of the population was below the poverty line.

Education

Ocean Springs is served by the Ocean Springs School District.

Elementary schools
 Pecan Park Elementary School
 Oak Park Elementary School
 Magnolia Park Elementary School
 Ocean Springs Upper Elementary

Middle schools
 Ocean Springs Middle School

High schools
 Ocean Springs High School

Alternative schools
 E. H. Keys Alternative School
The 3-D School, Gulf Coast Campus- A special-purpose school for children with dyslexia.

Media
Ocean Springs is served by the Gulfport–Biloxi–Pascagoula media market. Its primary daily newspapers is the Sun Herald.  Three local television stations also serve the area: WLOX, WXVO and WXXV.

Notable people
 

 James McConnell Anderson, artist
 Peter Anderson, artist and potter
 Walter Inglis Anderson, Artist
 Garrett Crochet, Major League Baseball player
 Alvin Endt, Mississippi legislator and educator
 Jeremy England, member of the Mississippi State Senate
 Ellen Gilchrist, author
 Raúl González, professional soccer player
 Jeffrey Guice, Mississippi legislator
 Gordon Gunter, scientist
 Eric L. Harry, lawyer and writer
 Osborne Helveston, former football player
 Jai Johanny Johanson, musician
 Brett Leland McLaughlin, Golden Globe nominated songwriter
 Connie Moran, former mayor of Ocean Springs
 Jeremiah Joseph O'Keefe, businessman, Mississippi state legislator, and mayor of Ocean Springs
 Laurin Pepper, football player and former Major League Baseball pitcher
 Luke Stewart, musician
 Stephen Whiting, United States Space Force lieutenant general. First commander of the Space Operations Command
 Al Young, educator and writer

References

External links

 
 Ocean Springs Chamber of Commerce
Downtown Ocean Springs website

Cities in Mississippi
Cities in Jackson County, Mississippi
Cities in Pascagoula metropolitan area
Populated places established in 1699
French-American culture in Mississippi
Populated coastal places in Mississippi
1699 establishments in the French colonial empire